79th Street may refer to:

In New York
 79th Street (Manhattan)
 Stations of the New York City Subway:
79th Street (BMT West End Line), in Brooklyn; serving the  trains
79th Street (IRT Broadway – Seventh Avenue Line), in Manhattan; serving the  trains

In Chicago
79th (CTA)
79th Street (Chatham) (Metra)
Cheltenham (79th Street) (Metra)

In Cleveland
East 79th station (GCRTA Red Line)
East 79th station (GCRTA Blue and Green Lines)

See also
 79th Street Station (disambiguation)